Mungos is a mongoose genus that was proposed by Étienne Geoffroy Saint-Hilaire and Frédéric Cuvier in 1795.

The genus contains the following species:

References

Mongooses
Carnivorans of Africa
Taxa named by Étienne Geoffroy Saint-Hilaire
Taxa named by Frédéric Cuvier